The following lists events that happened during 1908 in the Belgian Congo.

Incumbent
 Governor-general – Théophile Wahis

Events

See also

 Belgian Congo
 History of the Democratic Republic of the Congo
 1908 in the Congo Free State

References

Sources

 
Belgian Congo
Belgian Congo